Morley Mitchell Cohen, CM CQ, born in Winnipeg, Manitoba (1917–2001), was a Canadian entrepreneur, community builder, philanthropist, and Member of the Order of Canada.  He served with the Royal Canadian Air Force from 1940–1945.

Background 
Cohen came from a poor immigrant family of eight, the son of Alexander and Rose (Diamond) Cohen. His five brothers, John,  Albert D. Cohen, Harry B. Cohen, Samuel N. Cohen, and Joseph H. Cohen, set up a small retail store and, by 1939, the family had created General Distributors Ltd., a wholesale import firm. In the early fifties, the company obtained exclusive Canadian rights for Paper Mate pens. The brothers scattered across Canada in order to manage the national business, with Morley in Montreal. The brothers participated in various joint ventures and/or owned several minority interests in oil & gas exploration, development, and distribution.

Philanthropy 

Cohen was considered to be one of the major community builders/philanthropists in Montreal.

Several of his notable accomplishments include:
 Former Director of the Montreal Board of Trade (1973–1975)
 Former Chairman, Capital Fund Drive, YMHA (1980)
 Former Chairman, Arthritis Society (1980)
 Former Director of Canadian Unity Council (1983)
 Former Director of Montreal General Hospital (1988)
 Former Chairman, Capital Campaign,  Montreal Museum of Fine Arts (1989)

Morley and Rita Cohen Foundation
Founded in 1990,  the Morley and Rita Cohen Foundation was created for support and services within the charitable sector, hospitals, and universities/colleges.

Awards 
 Honorary Doctorate, Philosophy, University of Haifa (1985)  
 National Order of Quebec (1995) 
 Order of Canada (2000)

Sources

References

Anglophone Quebec people
Businesspeople from Montreal
Businesspeople from Winnipeg
Jewish Canadian philanthropists
Members of the Order of Canada
Knights of the National Order of Quebec
Royal Canadian Air Force personnel of World War II
1917 births
2001 deaths
20th-century philanthropists